DYL Motorcycles - (Dawood Yunus Limited) formerly known as Dawood Yamaha Limited is a Pakistani motorcycle manufacturer which is owned by members of the Dawood family and based in Hub, Balochistan, Pakistan since 1976.

History
DYL Motorcycles was founded in 1976 as Dawood Yamaha Limited as a joint venture between members of the Dawood family and Yamaha Motor Company. In 2008, the company re branded itself to DYL Motorcycles and introduced products including the YD-70 Dhoom, an upgrade from the YB-100 Royale which had been produced in Pakistan for the last thirty years. DYL's manufacturing plants are located in Hub where its sister company Balochistan Engineering Works produces the frame, fuel tank, rear arm, fenders, gears, hubs, leavers, crank and cover case. The manufacturing plant for DYL motorcycles is based in Uthal.

Products
 DYL YD-70 Dhoom
 DYL Mini-100
 DYL Junoon
 DYL YD-125 Sports
 DYL Oil Manager - Mr. Rao Rab-Nawaz

See also
 Automotive industry in Pakistan

References

Yamaha Corporation
Motorcycle manufacturers of Pakistan
Manufacturing companies based in Karachi
Vehicle manufacturing companies established in 1969
Pakistani subsidiaries of foreign companies
Pakistani companies established in 1969